Venera (Cyrillic: Венера) was a series of Soviet probes to Venus.

Venera may also refer to:

Santa Venera, town in Malta 
Venera Terra, region on Pluto named for the Venera program

People
Saint Venera (born ?), Christian martyr
Venera Chernyshova (born 1954), former Soviet biathlete
Venera Getova (born 1980), Bulgarian discus thrower
Venera Lumani (born 1991), Albanian singer from Macedonia
Venera Zaripova (born 1966), former Soviet rhythmic gymnast
Vénera Kastrati (born 1975), Albanian-Italian artist

Albanian feminine given names